An all-interval tetrachord is a tetrachord, a collection of four pitch classes, containing all six interval classes. There are only two possible all-interval tetrachords (to within inversion), when expressed in prime form. In set theory notation, these are [0,1,4,6] (4-Z15) and [0,1,3,7] (4-Z29). Their inversions are [0,2,5,6] (4-Z15b) and [0,4,6,7] (4-Z29b). The interval vector for all all-interval tetrachords is [1,1,1,1,1,1].

Table of interval classes as relating to all-interval tetrachords 

In the examples below, the tetrachords [0,1,4,6] and [0,1,3,7] are built on E.

Use in modern music
The unique qualities of the all-interval tetrachord have made it very popular in 20th-century music. Composers including Elliott Carter (First String Quartet) and George Perle used it extensively.

See also
All-interval twelve-tone row
All-trichord hexachord
Perfect ruler
Serialism
Trichord

References

External links 
The All-Interval Tetrachord, A Musical Application of Almost Difference Sets all-interval tetrachord tutorial
The Composition of Elliott Carter's Night Fantasies the use of all-interval tetrachords  in Elliott Carter
Interval String Table
Musical Set Theory
Structural and Transformational Properties of All-Interval Tetrachords a comprehensive analysis of all-interval tetrachords

Chords
Post-tonal music theory
Hemitonic scales
Musical set theory